is a Japanese professional footballer who plays as a midfielder for J.FC Miyazaki.

Career
After spending his youth career with both Júbilo Iwata and Momoyama Gakuin University, Kitagawa joined V-Varen Nagasaki of the J. League Division 2 in 2015. He made his professional debut for the club on 10 October 2015 against Ehime. He came on as a 67th-minute substitute for Hiroshi Azuma and earned a yellow card just three minutes in as V-Varen Nagasaki drew the match 0–0. Kitagawa then scored his first professional goal for V-Varen Nagasaki on 1 November against Omiya Ardija. However, his 72nd-minute goal only proved to be a consolation goal as Nagasaki fell 2–1.

Career statistics
Updated to 23 February 2020.

References

External links

Profile at V-Varen Nagasaki

1995 births
Living people
Momoyama Gakuin University alumni
Association football people from Shizuoka Prefecture
Japanese footballers
J2 League players
J3 League players
V-Varen Nagasaki players
Fujieda MYFC players
J.FC Miyazaki players
Association football midfielders